The United States Virgin Islands also known as the Virgin Islands is scheduled to compete at the 2023 Pan American Games in Santiago, Chile from October 20 to November 5, 2023. This will be the Virgin Islands's 15th appearance at the Pan American Games, having competed at every edition of the games since 1967.

Competitors
The following is the list of number of competitors (per gender) participating at the games per sport/discipline.

Archery

The Virgin Islands qualified two archers during the 2022 Pan American Archery Championships.

Fencing

The Virgin Islands qualified two male fencers through the 2022 Pan American Fencing Championships in Ascuncion, Paraguay.

Individual
Men

Sailing

The Virgin Islands has qualified 1 boat for a total of 1 sailor.

Women

See also
Virgin Islands at the 2024 Summer Olympics

References

Nations at the 2023 Pan American Games
2023
2023 in United States Virgin Islands sports